The 2017–18 A-League match between Central Coast Mariners and Newcastle Jets on 14 April 2018, set a record as the highest scoring match in the A-League history. The match was played at Central Coast Stadium in Gosford on 14 April 2018. Ten goals were scored in the match, leaving a final scoreline of 2–8 in Newcastle's favour.

Background
Newcastle started the match in second, below Sydney FC by 14 points. Central Coast were in 9th place, only above Wellington Phoenix by two points.

Match

Summary
Joe Champness opened the scoring in the 10th minute. Ten minutes later, Roy O'Donovan scored from a through ball from Steven Ugarkovic to score Newcastle' second goal of the game. Newcastle's third goal came from Riley McGree who finished top of the box with a low left foot shot to the right of the goal. A deflection cross by Andrew Hoole had Connor Pain score one goal back with an open net for the Central Coast Mariners. In the second half of the match, the 53rd minute had Newcastle score their fourth goal by Riley McGree. In the 60th minute, a corner was awarded which Newcastle used to score their fifth goal through Lachlan Jackson for his first goal for Newcastle Jets. A penalty was awarded by Jake McGing who fouled Joe Champness, as Roy O'Donovan scored his penalty for his second goal of the match. A seventh goal came as Riley McGree completed his hat-trick by scoring his third goal in the match with a left foot shot deflecting off Wout Brama. The final ten minutes, saw Trent Buhagiar score the Mariners' second goal in the 80th minute. One minute later, Patito Rodriguez cut back the ball to Dimitri Petratos who scored Newcastle's eighth goal, with ten minutes left. This was to be the aggregate record of most goals scored in an A-League match.

Details

Statistics

References

External links
 A-League official website

2017–18 A-League season
Central Coast Mariners FC matches
Newcastle Jets FC matches
April 2018 sports events in Australia